Sandra Garde, married surname: Gardes-Pagès, is a French former competitive figure skater. She is a two-time French national senior bronze medalist and competed at four World Junior Championships, twice finishing in the top ten. Her best result, fourth, came at the 1988 Junior Worlds in Brisbane, Australia.

Garde trained at Sports de Glace Annecy. After retiring from ISU competitions, she skated professionally. She went on to become a skating coach and choreographer, based in Nice. She has choreographed for Maé-Bérénice Méité, Yrétha Silété, Laurine Lecavelier, Lénaëlle Gilleron-Gorry, Stéphane Walker, and Simon Hocquaux.

Competitive highlights

References 

French female single skaters
Figure skating choreographers
Living people
Year of birth missing (living people)